Baisha is a town of Hanjiang District, Putian, Fujian, China. , it has one residential community and 12 villages under its administration.

References

Township-level divisions of Fujian
Putian